Alf Bertel "Bebbe" Storskrubb (24 April 1917 – 21 April 1996) was a Finnish middle-distance runner and hurdler. He competed at the 1948 Summer Olympics, where he placed fourth in the 4×400 m relay and competed in 400 m hurdles. He became European champion in the hurdles in 1946.

References

1917 births
1996 deaths
People from Jakobstad
Finnish male hurdlers
Olympic athletes of Finland
Athletes (track and field) at the 1948 Summer Olympics
European Athletics Championships medalists
Sportspeople from Ostrobothnia (region)